The 2005/06 NBL All-Star Game was held at the Sydney Entertainment Centre in Sydney, New South Wales on 27 December 2005. The attendance for this All-Star game was 4783 spectators.

The Aussie All-Stars defeated the World All-Stars 151–116.  Veteran Darryl McDonald from the Melbourne Tigers won the All-Star MVP award, registering 19 points, 10 assists, 5 rebounds and 6 steals.  Game high scorers included Chris Anstey (22), Glen Saville (20) and McDonald for the Aussie All-Stars, and Cortez Groves (19), Mike Helms (16) and Dusty Rychart (14) for the World All-Stars.

While named in the World All-Stars squad, Rolan Roberts did not play in the All-Star game due to suffering a season-ending shoulder injury during the Dunk Competition.

Line-up

Aussies
Head Coach: Brian Goorjian (Sydney Kings)

World
Head Coach: Phil Smyth (Adelaide 36ers)

Dunk Competition

The Dunk Competition was won by Everard Bartlett of the New Zealand Breakers.

Other competitors in the Dunk Competition included:
 Larry Abney (Townsville Crocodiles)
 Deba George (Cairns Taipans)
 Cortez Groves (Wollongong Hawks)
 Rolan Roberts (Sydney Kings)
 Liam Rush (Perth Wildcats)
 Pero Vasiljevic (West Sydney Razorbacks)

See also
 NBL (Australia) All-Star Game
 National Basketball League (Australia)

References

 Match Report
 Box Score

External links
 Official site of the NBL

2005–06
Sports competitions in Sydney
All-Star Game